Nguyễn Hoàng Hải (born 8 May 1986) is a Vietnamese badminton player from Army team. He was the bronze medalists at the 2009 Southeast Asian Games in the men's singles event, also in the team event in 2005. He represented his country at the 2006 Asian Games.

Achievements

Southeast Asian Games 
Men's singles

References

External links 
 

1986 births
Living people
People from Bắc Giang Province
Vietnamese male badminton players
Badminton players at the 2006 Asian Games
Asian Games competitors for Vietnam
Competitors at the 2005 Southeast Asian Games
Competitors at the 2007 Southeast Asian Games
Competitors at the 2009 Southeast Asian Games
Competitors at the 2011 Southeast Asian Games
Southeast Asian Games bronze medalists for Vietnam
Southeast Asian Games medalists in badminton